Mutarara, or Nhamayabué, is a town in Mozambique.  It lies on the north bank of the Zambezi River.

Transport 

Mutarara is served by a station on the Sena railway of Mozambique Ports and Railways. It is the junction for the line to Malawi. It also lies on the north end of the Dona Ana railway bridge over the Zambezi River.

See also 

 Railway stations in Mozambique

References 

Populated places in Tete Province